Nayagan is a 2008 Indian Tamil language film directed by Saravana Sakthi, produced by Chakya Celluloid, and written by Vijaykumar Reddy.

The film stars J. K. Rithesh,  Ramana, Sangeetha, Keerthi Chawla, Anita Hassanandani, and Anandaraj. It was subsequently dubbed into Telugu as Ankusam with a few portions reshot. The film features guest appearances in item numbers by Anita Hassanandani and Rachana Maurya. The music was composed by Mariya Manohar

The movie released on 22 August 2008, was a direct remake of the movie Vegam, released in 2007, which itself was an uncredited remake of the 2004 American action thriller film Cellular.

Plot
Dr. Sandhya Viswanath (Sangeetha) is kidnapped from her home by a gang and taken to another location, where she is questioned about her husband's whereabouts. Though the phone in her room is smashed by the gang's leader (Anandaraj), she manages to put together enough broken pieces to make random calls. One of her calls reaches Sakthi (Ramana), who has his own set of problems since he is on the run after eloping with his uncle's daughter Divya (Keerthi Chawla). Initially reluctant, he agrees to help Sandhya and drops the phone off at a police station. The cop Guru (J. K. Rithesh) talks to her but is distracted by another problem, and so Sandhya has to bank on Shakti again.

Cast 

 J. K. Rithesh as Guru
 Ramana as Sakthi
 Sangeetha as Dr. Sandhya Viswanath
 Keerthi Chawla as Divya
 Anita Hassanandani as Nila
 Rachana Maurya
 Anandaraj as Gang Leader (dual role)
 Radha Ravi
 Pandiarajan
 Sriman
 Vijay Babu
 Devipriya
 Santhana Bharathi
 Pandu
 Vaiyapuri
 Sabitha Anand
 Crane Manohar
 Scissor Manohar
 Muthukaalai

Soundtrack 
Music by Mariya Manohar.

"Chee Chee Poda"
"Irundhakka Allikodu"
"Manimaniyaga"
Naan Vellakkara Baby"
"Nila Nila Oodiva"
"Oosai Uyiroosai"

References

Remakes of Indian films
2008 films
2000s Tamil-language films